The Kiribati women's national football team is the women's national football team of Kiribati and is controlled by the Kiribati Islands Football Association. Kiribati is not a member of FIFA or of the Oceania Football Confederation (OFC), and is therefore not eligible to enter the FIFA Women's World Cup. Kiribati is a member of ConIFA, though there have been no women's tournaments to date for the side to participate in.

Background
	
Kiribati have played six international matches up to July 2019 where they scored 2 goals and conceded 38 in the Football at the 2003 South Pacific Games – Women's tournament. Kiribati's first match took place in Nausori, Fiji on 30 June 2003 when they played Papua New Guinea, losing 13–0 in a South Pacific Games match. The side have never won a match but came very close when they lost 2–1 to Tonga on 7 July 2003 also in the South Pacific Games in Fiji. Kiribati's only two goals in the 2003 Pacific games were scored by Moaniti Teuea versus Tonga in the 48th minute. and versus Tahiti in the 10th minute.

On 6 May 2016, Kiribati was formally accepted as the newest member of ConIFA (Confederation of Independent Football Associations), becoming the first ever Oceanic member to join the federation. As of July 2019, Kiribati's women's team have played no games under ConIFA.

Results and fixtures

Legend

2003

South Pacific / Pacific Games record

Brief Record
2003 – Round 1
2007 to 2019 – Did not enter

Performances

2003

Current squad
Squad selected for the 2003 Pacific Games.

|-

! colspan="9"  style="background:#b0d3fb; text-align:left;"|
|- style="background:#dfedfd;"

See also

 Kiribati national football team
 Kiribati national futsal team

References

External links
Kiribati women's results at rsssf

Oceanian women's national association football teams
Football in Kiribati
women's